The Leotiales are an order of ascomycete fungi. The order contains 2 families (the Bulgariaceae and the Leotiaceae), 11 genera, and 41 species.

References

Leotiomycetes